Rhyzodiastes patruus is a species of ground beetle in the subfamily Rhysodinae. It was described by R.T. & J.R. Bell in 1985. It is found in Johor (Peninsular Malaysia).

References

Rhyzodiastes
Beetles of Asia
Insects of Malaysia
Beetles described in 1985